Sakata Yogam is a 1946 Indian Tamil-language film directed by R. Padmanaban. The film stars Kothamangalam Seenu and V. N. Janaki.

Cast
List adapted from the database of Film News Anandan

Male cast
Kothamangalam Seenu
T. R. Ramachandran
Vidvan Srinivasan
T. S. Durairaj
Kali N. Rathnam

Female cast
V. N. Janaki
Mayavaram Pappa
P. A. Periyanayaki
C. T. Rajakantham

Production
The film was produced and directed by R. Padmanaban. P. Neelakantan wrote the screenplay and dialogues. The film was shot at Modern Theatres.

Soundtrack
Lyrics were penned by Palavangkudi Sama, S. G. Chellappa Iyer, Udumalai Narayana Kavi and T. K. Sundara Vathiyar. No music composer was credited. 2 songs sung by Kothamangalam Seenu - Bhoomi Iyarkai Kaana Kaana and Kalai Gnaaname Arulvaai became popular.

References

External links

1940s Tamil-language films
Indian black-and-white films